Bryam Alberto Rebellón Sánchez (born 22 January 1992) is a Colombian footballer who currently plays for Indy Eleven in the USL Championship..

Career
Rebellón spent time in both his native Colombia, and also in Argentina, before signing with United Soccer League side LA Galaxy II on 23 February 2016. On January 25, 2017, it was announced that Rebellón had signed with the Jacksonville Armada.

On 11 January 2019, Rebellón signed with USL Championship expansion team El Paso Locomotive FC. He left El Paso following the 2021 season.

In December 2021, it was announced Rebellón would make the move to Indy Eleven ahead of the 2022 season.

References

External links
 Galaxy II Profile

1992 births
Living people
Colombian footballers
Colombian expatriate footballers
Expatriate soccer players in the United States
LA Galaxy II players
Jacksonville Armada FC players
Sporting Kansas City II players
El Paso Locomotive FC players
Indy Eleven players
Association football midfielders
USL Championship players
People from Meta Department